The Kingdom Series is a series of six Christian allegorical novels set in mythical Arrethtrae with the flavor of the Middle Ages, and written by Chuck Black of Williston, North Dakota. The books cover the span of time from Book of Genesis through the Book of Revelation. The books were jointly published in 2006–2007 by Multnomah Publishing and Black's own company, Perfect Praise Publishing. The Black family collaborated to write the books and Black's daughter wrote music to them.

Books
 Kingdom’s Dawn - Book 1 (2006) : 
 Kingdom’s Hope - Book 2 (2006) : 
 Kingdom’s Edge - Book 3 (2006) : 
 Kingdom’s Call - Book 4 (2007) : 
 Kingdom’s Quest - Book 5 (2007) : 
 Kingdom’s Reign - Book 6 (2007) :

Sequels to The Kingdom Series
This series was followed by The Knights of Arrethtrae which is set in the same realm as The Kingdom Series. Black's third series, Wars of the Realm, was released in 2014.

References

External links
 

Christian allegory
Novel series
American Christian novels